State Highway 6 (SH 6) runs from the Red River, the Texas–Oklahoma state line, to northwest of Galveston, where it is known as the Old Galveston Highway. In Sugar Land and Missouri City, it is known as Alvin-Sugarland Road and runs perpendicular to Interstate 69/U.S. Highway 59 (I-69/US 59). In the Houston area, it runs north to Farm to Market Road 1960 (FM 1960), then northwest along USS 290 to Hempstead, and south to Westheimer Road and Addicks, and is known as Addicks Satsuma Road. In the Bryan–College Station area, it is known as the Earl Rudder Freeway. In Hearne, it is known as Market Street. In Calvert, it is known as Main Street. For most of its length, SH 6 is not a limited-access road. In 1997, the Texas Legislature designated SH 6 as the Texas Korean War Veterans Memorial Highway.

History

Historic routes

SH 6 was one of the original 25 state highways proposed on June 21, 1917, overlaying the King of Trails Highway. From 1919, the routing mostly followed present-day US 75 from Oklahoma to Dallas, then US 77 to Waco.

Current routes 
On August 21, 1923, SH 6 was extended along the eastern Gulf Division branch of SH 2 to keep SH 2 from having two separate highways with the same number. In 1926, US 75 and US 77 were overlaid on northern SH 6 from Waco northward through the Dallas area to Denison, and US 75 was overlaid on the section from Houston to Galveston. In 1935, US 290 was overlaid on the section from Hempstead to Houston. While the routes were marked concurrently, the concurrent SH 6 kept its numbering until September 26, 1939, when SH 6 was truncated to the Gulf Division routing ending at Waco. It was rerouted south from Hempstead to Galveston, replacing SH 242 and SH 38.

On September 26, 1945, the roadway was extended northwest to Breckenridge over SH 67, continuing northwest to near Throckmorton along SH 157, which was decommissioned. That same day, the section in southeast Texas between Hempstead and Sugar Land was canceled, as it was redundant with the new FM 359. On August 20, 1952, the route was truncated on the north side, ending near Breckenridge. This section was transferred to US 183. On September 26, 1967, SH 6 was rerouted to bypass Bremond, with the old route through Bremond transferred to SH 14 and FM 46. On November 1, 1968, the section between Hempstead and Sugar Land was re-established, as it was routed along US 290 until it reached FM 1960, then replacing FM 1960 southward to where the southern branch of SH 6 intersected to what is now I-69/US 59 in Sugar Land. That portion of FM 1960 from US 290 to then US 90 at Addicks was built in the 1950s, replacing and rerouting some of what was known as Jackrabbit Road. In the early 1970s, the northern section underwent a massive rerouting due to realignments of numerous U.S. and state highwayss. On August 4, 1971, the section from Breckenridge south to Eastland was redesignated as SH 69. SH 6 was instead rerouted west along US 80 to Cisco, then replaced US 380 northwest to near Old Glory. The route was again extended on July 31, 1975, replacing SH 283 between Old Glory and Stamford northward to the Texas–Oklahoma border, completing the current routing of SH 6. The old route of SH 6 was transferred to new SH 283. On October 27, 1989, a section from US 90A to McKeever Road (McKeever Bypass) was added.

A spur, SH 6A was designated on August 1, 1928, from SH 6 to Texas City. On March 19, 1930, this route was renumbered as SH 146.

In June 2016, a section of the highway in Eastland County between Cisco and Albany was destroyed due to major flooding.

Route description

SH 6 begins at an intersection with I-45 and SH 3 in Bayou Vista, and proceeds to the northwest, paralleling the ATSF railroad tracks. The highway makes a mostly straight line through Galveston, Brazoria, and Fort Bend Counties, passing through the city of Alvin. As the highway traverses through Sugar Land, it makes a turn to the north after passing intersections with I-69/US 59 and Alternate US 90. The highway continues north into western Harris County, reaching the Westpark Tollway and I-10. It then intersects US 290 in CyFair, joining it as they travel to the northwest, thus finishing a large routing around the southern and western portions of Houston. The route continues northwest with US 290 as a limited-access highway. At Hockley, the highway veers to the right, forking from an old alignment of the highway, and bypassing the cities of Waller and Hempstead to the north. At Hempstead, it splits from US 290 and turns northward into Grimes County, where it bypasses the city of Navasota, while Business SH 6 passes through town. The highway then turns northwest again, crossing into Brazos County. The highway starts another bypass here, going around the Bryan–College Station area to the northeast, while the business route goes through these cities. On the northeast side of Bryan, the highway meets US 190, and they travel together to the northwest out of the region. SH 6 splits with US 190 in the town of Hearne, but joins US 79 before that route splits to the northeast about a mile north of town. SH 6 then continues northwest, traveling through lesser populated farmlands, before approaching Waco. Before entering Waco, it turns southeast on Loop 340, and bypasses Waco to the south. It reaches an intersection with I-35, and then turns to the northwest again, crossing over Lake Waco. The highway continues northwest and west through more farmland regions in Central Texas, before reaching an intersection with I-20 just south of Eastland. The route briefly turns west, traveling along the former route of US 80, before turning back to the northwest at Cisco. As it continues, it is briefly concurrent with US 180/US 277 in north central Texas. Just northwest of Stamford, the highway makes its final turn to the north at an intersection with SH 283. The highway then travels through sparsely populated areas of Haskell, Knox, Foard, and Hardeman counties before ending north of Quanah at the Red River, where it meets Oklahoma State Highway 6.

Major intersections

Business routes
SH 6 has four business routes.

Marlin business loop

Business State Highway 6-N (Bus. SH 6-N, formerly Loop 23) is a business loop that runs from SH 6 near Marlin in central Texas. The road was bypassed on November 30, 1978 by SH 6 and designated Loop 23. The road was redesignated as Business SH 6-N on June 21, 1990.

Reagan business loop

Business State Highway 6-P (Bus. SH 6-P) is a  business loop that runs near Reagan. The road was bypassed on June 25, 2015, by SH 6 when it was rerouted west. Bus. SH 6-P shares a short, one-block concurrency with FM 413 through Reagan. Both ends of the route are only accessible directly from SH 6 westbound. Access to SH 6 eastbound can only be reached via an interchange with SH 6 and FM 413.

Major intersections

Bryan-College Station business loop

Business State Highway 6-R (Bus. SH 6-R, formerly Loop 507) is a business loop that runs through Bryan and College Station. The route runs on Texas Avenue in both cities. The road was redesignated as Bus. SH 6-R on June 21, 1990. It serves as the eastern boundary of Texas A&M University.

Navasota business loop

Business State Highway 6-S (Bus. SH 6-S, formerly Loop 508) is a business loop that runs through Navasota on La Salle Avenue. The road was redesignated as Bus. SH 6-S on June 21, 1990.

See also

References

External links

006
Transportation in Bosque County, Texas
Transportation in Brazoria County, Texas
Transportation in Brazos County, Texas
Transportation in Callahan County, Texas
Transportation in Comanche County, Texas
Transportation in Eastland County, Texas
Transportation in Erath County, Texas
Transportation in Falls County, Texas
Transportation in Foard County, Texas
Transportation in Fort Bend County, Texas
Transportation in Galveston County, Texas
Transportation in Grimes County, Texas
Transportation in Hamilton County, Texas
Transportation in Hardeman County, Texas
Transportation in Harris County, Texas
Transportation in Haskell County, Texas
Transportation in Jones County, Texas
Transportation in Knox County, Texas
Transportation in McLennan County, Texas
Transportation in Robertson County, Texas
Transportation in Shackelford County, Texas
Transportation in Waller County, Texas
U.S. Route 75
U.S. Route 183